Black-webbed treefrog or black-webbed tree frog is a common name of two species of frog in the genus Rhacophorus:

 Rhacophorus kio
 Rhacophorus reinwardtii

Animal common name disambiguation pages